The Public Accounts Commission is a UK body created under the National Audit Act 1983 to audit the National Audit Office, i.e., to watch the watchers.

Composition
The Commission comprises nine MPs, including the Leader of the House of Commons and the Chair of the Public Accounts Select Committee, who serve ex officio. The remaining seven, who may not be Ministers of the Crown, are chosen by the House of Commons. The Commission elects its chair from among its numbers. Members continue to serve despite a dissolution of Parliament, but—excepting the Chair of the Public Accounts Committee—are required to resign if they are not standing or are defeated for re-election. A list of current members is available on the UK Parliament website. , the membership consists of 9 MPs.

See also
 List of committees of the United Kingdom Parliament

References

Committees of the British House of Commons
Government audit